The Alexandria White Sox were a minor league baseball franchise based in Alexandria, Louisiana. In 1907 and 1908, the White Sox played exclusively as members of the Class D level Gulf Coast League. The Gulf Coast League folded during the 1908 season.

History
Minor league baseball began in Alexandria, Louisiana in 1907, when the White Sox began play as charter members of the six–team Class D level Gulf Coast League. The Lafayette Browns, Lake Charles Creoles, Monroe Municipals, Opelousas Indians and Orange Hoo-Hoos joined Alexandria as founding members.

The Alexandria White Sox finished their first season of play in 2nd place. With a 64–50 record in 1907, playing under manager Jack Auslet, Alexandria finished 7.0 games behind the 1st place Lake Charles Creoles in the final standings. Silver Braun of Alexandria, led the league in batting average, hitting .348, while his White Sox teammate H.B. Weeks led the league in wins, with 20.

The 1908 Alexandria White Sox folded along with the league during the season. After beginning play on April 30, 1908, the Gulf Coast League folded on June 3, 1908. At the time the league folded, Alexandria had a record of 14–15, playing under manager Henry Hoffman. The White Sox finished she shortened season in 3rd place 5.0 games behind the 1st place St. Charles Creoles.

The 1909 Alexandria Hoo Hoos continued minor league play as members of the Arkansas State League, with Jack Auslet returning as manager.

The ballpark
The name of the home ballpark for the 1907 and 1908 Alexandria White Sox is not known.

Timeline

Year–by–year records

Notable alumni
Ernie Herbert (1908)

See also
Alexandria White Sox players

References

External links
Baseball Reference

Baseball teams established in 1907
Baseball teams disestablished in 1908
1907 establishments in Louisiana
1908 disestablishments in Louisiana
Defunct baseball teams in Louisiana
Defunct Florida Complex League teams
Sports in Alexandria, Louisiana